Kinnard is a surname. Notable people with the surname include:

Claiborne H. Kinnard Jr. (1912–1966), military officer
Darian Kinnard (born 1999), American football player
George L. Kinnard (1803–1836), politician
Harry Kinnard (1915–2009), military officer
Ralph Kinnard, filmmaker
Rupert Kinnard (born 1954), cartoonist
Wendy Kinnard (born 1959), politician
William N. Kinnard (1926–2001), real estate educators

See also
 Kinnaird (disambiguation)